The Special Educational Needs and Disability Tribunal is a first-tier tribunal that is part of His Majesty's Courts and Tribunals Service, an executive agency of the Ministry of Justice of the United Kingdom.

It provides a route to appeal decisions made by local authorities regarding children's special educational needs and disability accommodation.

See also 
 Special Educational Needs and Disability Act 2001

References

External links 
 Special Educational Needs and Disability Tribunal; justice.gov.uk

United Kingdom tribunals
Education in the United Kingdom